Mendaro is a railway station in Mendaro, Basque Country, Spain. It is owned by Euskal Trenbide Sarea and operated by Euskotren. It lies on the Bilbao-San Sebastián line.

History 
The Elgoibar-Deba stretch in which the station is located opened in 1893, as part of the San Sebastián-Elgoibar railway. Works for the rebuilding of the station started in late 2021. The platforms will be widened and the level crossing will be substituted by elevators as part of the reform.

Services 
The station is served by Euskotren Trena line E1. Trains (in both directions) run every hour throughout the week.

References 

Euskotren Trena stations
Railway stations in Gipuzkoa